The International Conference on Parallel and Distributed Systems (ICPADS) is an academic conference sponsored by the IEEE Computer Society that brings together researchers and practitioners from academia and industry around the world to advance the theories, technologies, and applications of parallel and distributed systems.

The ICPADS was an international conference launched in 1992 by the computer science and engineering community in Taiwan in cooperation with the Technical Committee on Parallel Processing (TCPP) and Technical Committee on Distributed Processing (TCDP) of the IEEE Computer Society. Later it was sponsored by computer communities in Taiwan, Japan, and South Korea and held the conference annually in these countries. Since 1998, the ICPADS has been sponsored by the TCPP and TCDP of the IEEE Computer Society. ICPADS 2004 is the first ICPADS held outside the East Asia region. Professor Wen-Tsuen Chen of the National Tsing Hua University, Taiwan served as the founding General Chairman of ICPADS 1992. He had been the Steering Committee Chairman of the ICPADS since 1992 until he was succeeded by Professor Nionel M. Ni of the Hong Kong University of Science and Technology in 2008.

Topics covered by ICPADS
 Parallel and Distributed Algorithms and Applications
 Multi-core and Multithreaded Architectures
 High Performance Computational Biology and Bioinformatics
 Power-aware and Green Computing
 Resource Management and Scheduling
 Peer-to-Peer Computing
 Cluster, Grid and Cloud Computing
 Web-based Computing and Service-Oriented Architecture 
 Data Intensive Computing and Data Centre Architecture
 Wireless and Mobile Computing
 Security and Privacy
 Performance Modelling and Evaluation

Systems topics include the following:
 Distributed and Parallel Operating Systems
 Communication and Networking Systems
 Dependable and Trustworthy Systems
 Real-Time and Multimedia Systems
 Ad Hoc and Sensor Networks
 Cyber-Physical Systems
 Embedded Systems

ICPADS locations
Main locations (1992–2015, 20 conferences): 17 times in Asia, 2 times in North America, 2 times in Oceania

 21. ICPADS 2015: Melbourne, Australia
 20. ICPADS 2014: Hsinchu, Taiwan
 19. ICPADS 2013: Seoul, South Korea
 18. ICPADS 2012: Singapore, Singapore
 17. ICPADS 2011: Tainan, Taiwan
 16. ICPADS 2010: Shanghai, China
 15. ICPADS 2009: Shenzhen, China
 14. ICPADS 2008: Melbourne, Australia
 13. ICPADS 2007: Hsinchu, Taiwan
 12. ICPADS 2006: Minneapolis, Minnesota, USA
 11. ICPADS 2005: Fukuoka, Japan
 10. ICPADS 2004: Newport Beach, California, USA
 9. ICPADS 2002: Zhongli, Taiwan
 8. ICPADS 2001: KyongJu, Korea
 7. ICPADS 2000: Iwate, Japan
 6. ICPADS 1998: Tainan, Taiwan
 5. ICPADS 1997: Seoul, Korea
 4. ICPADS 1996: Tokyo, Japan
 3. ICPADS 1994: Hsinchu, Taiwan
 2. ICPADS 1993: Taipei, Taiwan
 1. ICPADS 1992: Hsinchu, Taiwan

See also
 List of distributed computing conferences
 List of computer science conferences

Academic conferences
Computer science conferences
Distributed computing conferences